ReCore is an action-adventure and platform video game developed by Comcept and Armature Studio, with assistance from Asobo Studio, and published by Microsoft Studios for Windows and Xbox One. The game was released worldwide in September 2016 and re-released in August 2017.

The story tracks Joule Adams, one of the first volunteers for the utopian colony of Far Eden, who wakes after centuries in cryo-sleep to find that nothing has gone according to plan. With her three robotic machines known as corebot companions, Joule ventures throughout Far Eden to uncover the secrets behind the failed mission. The open world of Far Eden is subject to exploration and the collection of resources. Joule's weapons are color-coded to inflict damage on a particular set of enemies and, like her companions, can also be enhanced. The corebots support her in battle and puzzle solving.

Development began in 2014. The game was directed by Mark Pacini, written by Joseph Staten and conceptualized by Keiji Inafune. Mega Man and Metroid were significant influences in its creation. The development was divided between Armature Studio and Comcept into their own distinctive proficiencies, while Asobo Studio assisted. ReCore received mixed reviews, the most critical of which noted insufficient design choices, technical issues regarding lengthy and unsuccessful loading screens and repetitive combat, while praise was overall focused on the story, platforming and controls.

Gameplay 

ReCore is an action-adventure and platform game played from a third-person perspective. It centers around Joule Adams and her three robotic machines known as corebot companions, who aid her in combat and puzzle solving; these types of machines can be improved, should players find the blueprints and materials to do so, which grants upgrades to their attack and defense. The machines' cores can be swapped between them, changing their abilities in succession, and their frames are rearrangeable. Players can level up Joule's weapons and vitality. Ranged weapons have three kinds of ammunition that take down an enemy with a matching color: red, blue and yellow. Furthermore, if one of Joule's corebots matches the color of an enemy, it will thus inflict more damage in combat. Joule also wields a grappling hook that she uses to extract her enemies' energy cores after a certain amount of damage is done. Joule must dodge, jump or dash quickly to avoid taking damage.

Joule navigates the open world of Far Eden either on foot equipped with rocket boosters on her shoes and her back, across platforms with the grappling hook or via fast travel. The scenery may be altered by sandstorms, unveiling new areas to explore. Corebots can speak their own language called DigiMode, which the players are permitted to translate. Dungeons leading to progression in the story and containing resources that can be used for crafting are scattered throughout the world for Joule to unlock by way of collecting cores.

Plot 
ReCore is set roughly 200 years in the future. In the course of the early 2020s, a disease called the "Dust Devil Plague" began to ravage the Earth. An organization named Mandate led global efforts to fight the disease. As the Earth became uninhabitable, Mandate launched several missions to a new planet known as Far Eden. Far Eden was discovered many light-years away in the first decades of the 21st century. Several thousand corebots were sent to build atmospheric processing facilities on Far Eden, and the first group of colonists was sent. The colonists were to hibernate in cryo-sleep for 200 years while the terraforming process finished. During this period, many of the colonists vanished, and the corebots became corrupted.

The game begins on the desert world of Far Eden as one of the colonists Joule Adams (Erika Soto) and her corebot Mack (Jonathan Lipow) are walking past the wreckage of her cryo-sleep maintenance habitat, or "crawler", from which she previously woke. They venture out to obtain a power core to get the crawler back online. Eventually finding it inside a corebot, Joule pries it out with her extractor tool. Joule and Mack then return to the crawler, switching its power back on. Joule sets out to reactivate a terraforming pylon that she learns has been offline for ninety-six years. After Joule manages to reboot the pylon, she receives a distress signal from a beacon that had until then been obstructed. Once she obtains a prismatic core in order to progress towards the signal, enemy corebots appear. On the order of Victor (Alex Fernandez), the leader of the corebots, they demand that she hand over the core. When she refuses, they become agitated. She defeats the enemies and proceeds to her destination. There, she encounters amputee Kai Brehn (Harry Shum) and his corebot Seth. Kai requests aid for his leg and Joule complies. She reveals the prismatic core, as it might assist him. Kai urges her to travel to the core foundry so that Joule may discover the answers to its potential. Seth accompanies her.

In the foundry, Joule is able to analyze the prismatic core. She can make out voices coming from the core – including her father's – thus deducing that it is a transmission of sorts. Heading to Eden Tower to decrypt the core's transmission, she agrees to meet Kai there. Once reunited, they are ambushed by Victor. Kai stays behind to provide Joule the time to escape. She finds a lost crawler filled with parietal art indicating that Victor had manipulated the other corebots to attack the maintenance habitats. Corebot Duncan enters, lamenting the death of his human companion, and unites with Joule against Victor. Joule approaches Eden Tower to activate it, only to be faced with Victor and his minions. She learns that the ships, once orbiting Far Eden while waiting for its terraforming to complete, are long gone, having been destroyed by Victor. He throws Kai's prosthetic leg to the ground, proclaiming him dead. Finally, Joule bests Victor in combat and activates the terraforming system, materializing a hologram of her father from parts of memories hidden in the cores. In the end, it becomes clear that Kai survived his confrontation with Victor.

Development 

Development started in early 2014 and took 14 months to go into full production. The concept was contributed by Keiji Inafune, who wished to convey the idea of surviving in a world verging on human extinction. The developers first came up with the robots, whose anatomical design problems would later be solved by the insertion of cores – essentially robot souls – to explain their propulsion. Writer Joseph Staten resolved to create a simple story to enhance an emotional backdrop more grounded in complexity. ReCore was designed by Comcept, which is a development studio founded by former Capcom employee Keiji Inafune. Partnering with Comcept was Armature Studio, formed by designers who worked on Metroid Prime 3: Corruption and the prior Mega Man X series spin-off concept Maverick Hunter. Dividing labor between the studios into each their expertise, Armature Studio developed the technical assets while Comcept maintained the base philosophy of the world, characters and story. Using the Unity game engine, Armature Studio collaborated with Unity Technologies to advance its animation state machine system, Mecanim, for its application in ReCore. Asobo Studio assisted in a share of the development including creating the game's world and enemies. The game was directed by Mark Pacini of the Metroid Prime series. Mega Man and Metroid influenced the manner in which the robotic characters and world-unlocking were developed, and the cinematic story was impacted by Staten's reading of The Jungle Book. Chad Seiter composed the score.

Release
ReCore was first revealed at E3 2015 during Microsoft's opening press conference. At the conclusion of the debut trailer, Microsoft revealed the game was to be released in the second quarter of 2016 on the Xbox One. On January 4, 2016, Microsoft announced that ReCore would also be released for Windows. ReCore was released as the first title of Xbox's Play Anywhere program – the opportunity to play the game on both Windows and Xbox One, no matter the platform for which it was initially purchased – on September 13, 2016, in North America and Australia, September 15 in Japan and September 16 in Europe. After the loading screens were criticized, a patch was made to assuage their long duration on the Xbox One. An artbook, The Art of ReCore, was published on September 27, 2016, by Dark Horse Comics. A free trial version lasting 30 minutes was released the following month in concurrence with an update launched to polish the audio, performance, waypoints, achievement tracking, collision locations, checkpoints and respawn points. ReCore: Definitive Edition was released on August 29, 2017, adding story content, areas to explore, and gameplay changes and repairs.

Reception 

ReCore received "mixed or average" reviews, according to review aggregator Metacritic. The game was the fifth best-selling retail video game in the UK in its week of release, according to Chart-Track. It was nominated for the 2016 Unity Awards in the category of Best 3D Visuals and for Xbox Game of the Year at the 2016 Golden Joystick Awards. Brett Makedonski of Destructoid had a mixed response to ReCore. Though describing the game to be "brimming with ideas", Makedonski criticized the design for being injurious to its foundation. He felt the fetch quests were repetitive and over represented as part of the gameplay experience, and that it failed to do justice to the narrative. Makedonski praised the game's controls, but had issues with the combat for its tedious nature and inability to advance. Keri Honea of Game Revolution showed little enthusiasm for the game, considering the dungeon raids "formulaic", boring and repetitive. The unlockable "Arena Dungeons" were declared unintelligible in the context of the game's established world. In addition to combat abilities being recounted as "pointless and padded", loading times – lasting up to 4 minutes – also met charges of criticism. Honea concluded that the "first couple of hours of ReCore were almost downright magical" but grew disenchanted with everything but the story, which was seen as its only redeeming quality. Tamoor Hussain of GameSpot called it a modest action game whose length suffered a condition of insecurity, yet added that most of its ventures were carried out successfully. Hussain found the combat "quite pleasing" despite its simplicity, in particular the extraction of cores, which he likened to reeling in a fish. Though marred by an apparent lack of visual diversity, the world appeared conversely evocative according to Hussain. Also subject to complaint were lengthy and unsuccessful loading screens, and the rate at which it crashed on the Xbox One.

Sam Prell of GamesRadar wrote that ReCore signified good ideas, when poorly executed. Prell explains that, for all the game's positive aspects, they were outweighed by some considerable problems. He cited its extensive loading times as one of the most frequent offenders, which would also cause the game to crash. Other technical issues included bugs and frame rates that would scale down dramatically. The main story was nevertheless appreciated, even though it had a slight running time and, as concluded by Prell, resulted in a "padded" experience. Arthur Gies of Polygon took the view that, however strong a first impression the fundamentals and ideas yielded, the game's overall quality was reduced by being drawn out beyond its capabilities with superfluous material. A more favorable aspect was the combo system, which was said to channel "early '00s Japanese action games in a way that feels hard to resist". Traversal challenges and controls were also lauded. Further, Polygon disparaged the design for the game's considerable length, and sensed it was to compensate for the small number of story missions. The loot and crafting system appeared minimal in action and the grinding involved was found to be "annoying" and "a real chore". Mike Williams of USgamer endorsed the combat and platforming's reminiscence to Mega Man Legends and Metroid Prime, respectively. Williams wrote that the corebots were one of ReCores strongest aspects and judged exploration to be the most robust feature, but found that the story was obstructed by the level-based progression.

The release of the Definitive Edition update was met with a more positive reception due to technical fixes, improved loading times, changes to gameplay and additional content. Makedonski was favorable to the update, noting gameplay improvements that altered the pacing to lessen repetition, overall calling the update "what ReCore should've been in the first place."

References

External links 
 

2016 video games
Action-adventure games
Metroidvania games
Microsoft games
Open-world video games
Platform games
Post-apocalyptic video games
Video games about robots
Science fiction video games
Single-player video games
Shooter video games
Video games developed in France
Video games developed in Japan
Video games developed in the United States
Video games featuring female protagonists
Video games set on fictional planets
Windows games
Xbox Cloud Gaming games
Xbox One games
Xbox Play Anywhere games
Xbox One X enhanced games